Jean-Félix Dorothée (born 2 October 1981) is a French footballer. Currently, he plays in the Championnat de France amateur for UJA Alfortville.

Club career
He joined Mouscron in January 2005 on free transfer, having signed a 3.5-year contract.

International career

France youth
He was in the French squad of 2001 FIFA World Youth Championship.

Guadeloupe
In early 2008, he was asked to represent Guadeloupe, as he is part Guadeloupean. He agreed to play for his adopted nation, but never made his debut as he missed his chance through injury. He was promised a place in Guadeloupe's squad to face numerous other countries. Dorothée gave a press conference saying that he believed that Guadeloupe had what it took to qualify for the 2010 World Cup

External links

1981 births
Living people
People from Le Blanc-Mesnil
French people of Guadeloupean descent
French footballers
France youth international footballers
French expatriate footballers
French expatriate sportspeople in Spain
Expatriate footballers in Spain
Expatriate footballers in Belgium
Association football fullbacks
Stade Rennais F.C. players
La Liga players
Valencia CF players
Royal Excel Mouscron players
INF Clairefontaine players
UJA Maccabi Paris Métropole players
Footballers from Seine-Saint-Denis